The 1941 Tour de Suisse was the eighth edition of the Tour de Suisse cycle race and was held from 23 August to 24 August 1941. The race started and finished in Zürich. The race was won by Josef Wagner.

General classification

References

1941
Tour de Suisse